Howard Arthur Fest (born April 11, 1946) is a former American football offensive lineman who played in the  American Football League (AFL) and in the National Football League (NFL).

He attended Thomas Edison High School in San Antonio. He played college football at the University of Texas, where he was a tight end. As a sophomore during the 1965 season, he played sparingly and caught one pass for nine yards as the Longhorns went 6-4 under College Football Hall of Fame coach Darrell Royal. In his junior year he was switched to offensive tackle as the Longhorns went 7-4, including a 19-0 win in the Bluebonnet Bowl over Ole Miss. In his senior season of 1967, the Longhorns were 6-4.

After his senior year, he was chosen in the sixth round (139th overall) of the 1968 NFL/AFL Draft by the Cincinnati Bengals.

He was an original member of the AFL Cincinnati Bengals, playing with them for eight years. He began his career at tackle, but later moved to guard. He was given the nickname "Mr. Consistency" by his teammates.

During his eight seasons with the Bengals, he never missed a game, playing in 112 games, of which he started 63.

He was made available in the 1976 NFL Expansion Draft, and was selected by the Tampa Bay Buccaneers, where he played two seasons. He started all 14 games of the 1976 season. He played in just one game his final season of 1977.

References

1946 births
Living people
Players of American football from San Antonio
American football offensive guards
American football offensive tackles
Texas Longhorns football players
Cincinnati Bengals players
Tampa Bay Buccaneers players
American Football League players